Mäeküla (Estonian for "Hill Village") is a subdistrict in the district of Haabersti, Tallinn, the capital of Estonia. It has a population of 2.

References

Subdistricts of Tallinn